Mark Robert James Watt (born 29 July 1996) is a Scottish cricketer. He made his Twenty20 International debut against Ireland on 18 June 2015. He made his List A debut in the 2015–17 ICC World Cricket League Championship on 31 July 2015 against Nepal. On 5 February 2016 he took his first five-wicket haul in a T20I match, picking up five wickets for 27 runs against the Netherlands in the UAE. He made his first-class debut in the 2015–17 ICC Intercontinental Cup on 9 August 2016 against the United Arab Emirates. He made his One Day International (ODI) debut against Hong Kong on 8 September 2016.

In July 2019, he was selected to play for the Edinburgh Rocks in the inaugural edition of the Euro T20 Slam cricket tournament. However, the following month the tournament was cancelled.

In September 2019, he was named in Scotland's squad for the 2019 ICC T20 World Cup Qualifier tournament in the United Arab Emirates. In May 2021, during the ODI series against the Netherlands, Watt took his 100th wicket in international cricket for Scotland. In September 2021, Watt was named in Scotland's provisional squad for the 2021 ICC Men's T20 World Cup.

In March 2022, Watt was re-signed by Derbyshire County Cricket Club to play in the 2022 T20 Blast in England. The following month, in the 2022 Papua New Guinea Tri-Nation Series match against Oman, Watt played in his 100th international match for Scotland.

References

External links
 

1996 births
Living people
Scottish cricketers
Scotland One Day International cricketers
Scotland Twenty20 International cricketers
Lancashire cricketers
Marylebone Cricket Club cricketers
Cricketers from Edinburgh
Derbyshire cricketers